Harting is an electoral ward of Chichester District, West Sussex, England and returns one member to sit on Chichester District Council.

Following a district boundary review, the former ward of Rogate was split and merged into Harting in 2019.

Councillor

Election results

* Elected

References

External links
 Chichester District Council
 Election Maps

Wards of Chichester District